Bernard IV of Astarac (1249– c. 1291) was a count of the .

Family 
He was the third son of Centule I and Séguine d'Armagnac, and the brother of Centule II. Bernard became Count of Astarac following the disappearance of his brother, who died without descendants in 1249. His wife's name is unknown. He had four known children:
 Centule III
 Jean
 Bernard
 Arnaud, married to Jeanne de Faudoas.

Bastides 
Bernard d'Astarac is at the origin of the foundation of the bastides of Seissan (1266), Masseube (1274) and Mirande (1281).

The troubadour 
A tenson (song); with Giraut Riquier.

References

External links 
 La poésie lyrique des troubadours on Google books
 Généalogie des comtes d'Astarac
  La famille Astarc et la gestion du territoire comtal entre le début du X siècle et le milieu du XVIe siècle on raco.cat

Year of birth missing
1290s deaths
Year of death uncertain
Counts of Astarac
13th-century French troubadours